The Window to Luna Park is a 1957 Italian drama film directed by Luigi Comencini. It was entered into the 7th Berlin International Film Festival.

Cast
 Giulia Rubini - Ada, Aldo's wife
 Gastone Renzelli - Aldo
 Pierre Trabaud - Righetto
 Calina Classy - Aida
 Gisella Mancinotti - Antonietta
 Luigi Russo - Spartaco
 Remo Galli - Niccodemo
 Lina Galli - Rosa
 Primo Raschi - Il nonno
 Vittoria Marone - La nonna
 Giancarlo Damiani - Mario, Aldo's son
 Silvana Jachino - The teacher
 Luigi Russo - Spartaco

References

External links

1957 films
1950s Italian-language films
Films set in Rome
1957 drama films
Films directed by Luigi Comencini
Italian black-and-white films
Films with screenplays by Suso Cecchi d'Amico
Films scored by Alessandro Cicognini
1950s Italian films